Anne Désirée Ouloto (born 20 April 1966) is a Ivorian politician from Rally of the Republicans who serves as Minister of Public Service in the Achi II government.

References 

Living people
1966 births
21st-century Ivorian politicians
21st-century Ivorian women politicians
Women government ministers of Ivory Coast

Health ministers of Ivory Coast